John Francis Seymour Jr. (born December 3, 1937) is an American retired politician who served as a United States Senator from California from 1991 to 1992. A member of the Republican Party, he was appointed to continue Pete Wilson's term but lost the special election to finish it to Democratic candidate and former San Francisco Mayor Dianne Feinstein. As of 2022, he is the most recent member of the Republican Party to serve as a U.S. Senator from California. Seymour was also the last U.S. Senator from Southern California until Alex Padilla took office on January 20, 2021, replacing Kamala Harris when she was inaugurated as Vice President of the United States.

Life and career
Born in Chicago, Seymour attended public schools in Mt. Lebanon, Pennsylvania. He served in the United States Marine Corps from 1955 to 1959 and graduated from the University of California, Los Angeles in 1962. Seymour was the President of the California Association of Realtors from 1978 to 1982, and worked in the real estate business from 1962 to 1981.

Seymour served Anaheim as a member of its city council from 1974 to 1978, as the 39th Mayor of Anaheim from 1978 to 1982, and as a State Senator from 1982 to 1991. In the California Senate, he voted to ban assault weapons, to outlaw discrimination against people with AIDS, and to increase spending for social programs including education and mental health benefits. As Mayor of Anaheim, Seymour was instrumental in recruiting the Los Angeles Rams to move to Anaheim Stadium.

In 1991, Seymour was appointed to the U.S. Senate by Governor Pete Wilson to serve in the seat Wilson had vacated to become governor. Seymour's appointment lasted until the 1992 special election to select a replacement who would serve until the normal expiration of Wilson's term in 1995. Former San Francisco Mayor Dianne Feinstein defeated Seymour in the special election.

After his Senate term, Seymour served as director of the California Housing Finance Agency for two years, and later served as CEO of the nonprofit Southern California Housing Development Corporation and on the boards of directors of several housing-related companies including IndyMac Bank, Orange Coast Title Insurance, Los Angeles Federal Savings Bank, and Irvine Apartment Communities. Seymour currently lives in San Marcos, California.

See also

List of United States senators from California
List of mayors of Anaheim, California

References
 Retrieved on 2008-03-31

External links

Join California John Seymour

1937 births
Living people
Republican Party California state senators
Mayors of Anaheim, California
Military personnel from Illinois
People from Mt. Lebanon, Pennsylvania
Politicians from Chicago
United States Marines
Republican Party United States senators from California
20th-century American politicians